David Farquhar Allison (born 26 June 1948) is an English former first-class cricketer. He was a right-handed batsman and wicket-keeper who played first-class cricket in 1970 for Oxford University Cricket Club. He was born at Marylebone in London and educated at Greenmore College in Birmingham and Brasenose College, Oxford.

Allison played two games for Warwickshire Second XI in 1968. He made his first-class debut for Oxford University against Hampshire County Cricket Club in April 1970. He went on to play six first-class and three other matches for the University side during 1970, including playing in the 1970 University Match.

References

External links

1948 births
English cricketers
Living people
Oxford University cricketers
Alumni of Brasenose College, Oxford